This is a list of supporting characters of Luke Cage and Iron Fist, appearing in American comic books published by Marvel Comics.

Allies
 El Aguila – Mutant swashbuckler and costumed crime fighter.
 Noah Burstein – The scientist who gives Luke Cage his powers.
 Reva Connors - Reva Connors was friends with, and eventually started dating, Carl Lucas the man who would eventually become Luke Cage. Cage's former friend, Willis Stryker, was jealous of their romance and framed Cage with stolen drugs. When the Maggia came after Stryker, they inadvertently killed Connors.
 David "D.W." Griffith – A theater owner and friend of Luke Cage.
 Jeryn Hogarth – Attorney and friend of Iron Fist's father.
 Jessica Jones – Wife and partner of Luke Cage
 Misty Knight – Frequent partner of Luke Cage and Iron Fist.
 Lei Kung – Taught martial arts to Iron Fist.
 Joy Meachum – Blamed Iron Fist for the death of her father, and later became an ally of his.
 Claire Temple – Doctor and friend of Luke Cage.
 Colleen Wing – Frequent partner of Luke Cage and Iron Fist.
 Yu-Ti – Immortal lord of K'un-L'un.

Family
 Esther Lucas - Esther Lucas is the wife of James Lucas and the mother of James Lucas Jr. and Carl, the latter of whom would grow up to become Luke Cage. Despite loving Carl, she and her husband were also disappointed in his continuous run ins with the law and were embarrassed about having to bail him out. Esther was killed by one of Carl's gang members causing James and James Jr. to blame him.
 James Lucas - The father of Luke Cage.
 Heather Rand - Heather Duncan was a young wealthy socialite who met and fell in love with the mysterious Wendell Rand. The two married and Heather gave birth to Danny who would grow up to become Iron Fist. Wendell convinced Heather to bring Danny on their trip to the Himalayas. While there Wendell's business partner, Harold Meachum, kills Wendell claiming that he did it out of his love for Heather. Heather was sickened by his actions and was left for dead with Danny. While the two continued to venture towards K'un-L'un, they were attacked by a wolf pack with one of the wolves later becoming Ferocia. With nothing left to lose, Heather threw herself at the pack to save Danny giving up her life in the process. Heather found herself in Feng-Tu, the K'un-L'un afterlife. Startled by the realization that her husband was not from Earth, Heather fled until she found herself confronted by Dhasha Khan who transformed her into the Silver Dragon and was forced to fight her now grown up son. When Danny realized he was fighting his mother, Heather resisted and was incinerated by Khan. Later, Danny was able to free her mother's soul from Khan and she returned to Feng-Tu Later when Danny was on death's door, he is reunited with his parents who inform him that his time is not up and that they were proud of the man he had become.
 Wendell Rand - Wendell Rand was an orphan who fought tooth and nail to survive on the streets of Nepal. One day, Wendell encountered Orson Randall who was the then current Iron Fist. After saving Orson from being poisoned, Wendell was taken under his wing and trained in the martial arts. Upon learning of K'un-L'un, Wendell was determined to find the city and become the new Iron Fist. Despite Orson's warnings, Wendell set out on his journey. Wendell eventually found K'un-L'un after crossing the frozen tundra and nearly freezing to death. After saving the lives of Lord Tuan and his son Nu-An, Wendell was adopted by Tuan and became a student of Lei Kung the Thunderer. Years later, Wendell married native Shakirah and had a daughter with her named Miranda. However, due to Nu-An's jealousy, Wendell forced both his wife and child to leave the city. At the end of a tournament for the right to challenge for the power of the Iron Fist, Wendell defeated Lei Kung's son Davos and spared his life rather than kill him. Having become disillusioned with K'un-L'un, Wendell chose not to challenge the guardian of the Iron Fist but to return to Earth instead. Wendell reunited with Orson, who was slowly dying, and would protect his adopted father from various hazards. Orson soon passed, but not before leaving Wendell a fortune from which he would build an entire business empire. After returning to America, Wendell married Heather Duncan who would bear him a son, Danny. When Danny turned ten, Wendell decided it was time to return to K'un-L'un. Wendell took Heather, Danny and his business partner Harold Meachum through the Himalayas, but during the trip Harold let Wendell fall to his doom and then abandoned Heather and Danny when Heather wouldn't return his affections. Wendell and Heather ended up in Feng-Tu, the afterlife of K'un-L'un. When Danny was on death's door, he was reunited with his parents who informed him that his time was not up and that they were proud of the man he had become.
 Miranda Rand - Miranda Rand is the daughter of Wendell Rand and K'un-Lun native Shakirah. Shakirah was soon murdered and Wendell fled leaving Miranda an orphan. She was soon trained by Conal D'Hu-Tsien, who was in love with her. They encountered Danny Rand, who had taken the name Iron Fist, and aided him in battling Merrin. When they discovered that Miranda was a woman both she and Conal were put on trial as it was against the law to train women in martial arts. Danny tried to save them, but he was unsuccessful. Before being taken away, Miranda revealed to Danny that she was his sister. Miranda and Conal were rescued by a H'ylthri who in return demanded that they retrieve the Scorpio Key from a S.H.I.E.L.D. base. They were given new costumes and identities with Miranda taking Death Sting. Miranda and Conal hired many villains to aid them and she fought her brother. Eventually, Miranda got the Scorpio Key and used it to defeat the H'ylthri and rescue her brother, though at the cost of Conal's life. Miranda disappeared afterwards. Years later, Miranda was revealed to be in Hell and was forced to battle her ancestor Orson Randall. Danny showed up and was able to rescue his sister who wished to return to a normal life.

Enemies
This section lists the villains that fight Luke Cage and Iron Fist:

 Baron - A knight-themed crime leader who uses ancient weapons modified with advanced technology.
 Big Brother - A crime leader who increases his strength with a special exo-skeleton.
 Black Mariah – Criminal who uses her size against her enemies.
 Bushmaster – Crime boss who gained the same powers as Luke Cage, and can absorb energies from other people.
 Chemistro – Three villains who used alchemy powers to transmute matter.
 Cheshire Cat – Villain with the ability to become invisible and intangible.
 Coldfire - James Lucas, Jr. was born and raised in Harlem, New York and lived in an apartment block with mother, father, and younger brother. As he grew up he started to hate his criminal brother and believed that he brought shame upon the family. His father James had to keep bailing Carl out of prison. He even blamed his brother Carl Lucas, who would later become the superhero known as Luke Cage for the death of their mother. The brothers fought constantly and over time James hatred for his brother grew and grew. When Carl went to prison James and his father moved around the country trying to keep him away from Carl. The pair did not even know each other was still alive. James Jr. was unable to fight his super powered brother so decided to gain abilities of his own he went through a mutagenic process devised by the scientist Dr. Karl Malus stolen from technology used by the Soviets. His body was altered so he was engulfed in a white-hot flame which did not burn him. With this new power he took on the name of "Coldfire" and began his revenge against his brother.
 Comanche – Criminal is an Indian-themed villain was once in the same gang as Luke Cage. Ward Meachum later provided him with a bow and trick arrows.
 Cottonmouth – A drug kingpin who gained the same powers as Luke Cage.
 Diamondback – Childhood friend and later enemy of Luke Cage.
 Discus – A villain who wields a throwing disc.
 Big Ben Donovan – A lawyer who represents supervillains.
 Eel – Supervillain who uses a costume with a variety of abilities.
 Ferocia – A K'un-L'un wolf was magically uplifted into a humanoid woman by Master Khan.
 Goldbug – Supervillain who used gold-themed paraphernalia.
 Golden Tigers - An important and feared martial arts gang operating in Chinatown.
 Chaka Khan - Robert Hao was the original crime lord of the Golden Tigers. He led the Golden Tigers in taking advantage of the power vacuum left by the arrest of Maggia crime lord Ruffio Costra. He was defeated by Iron Fist, Misty Knight, and Coleen Wing and arrested by the police.
 Chaka – Thomas Arn is a former judo instructor and the current crime lord of the Golden Tigers and an enemy of Iron Fist.
 Chen-Wu - A member of the Golden Tigers that worked for Chaka Khan.
 Chin-Lee - 
 Kwai Chang - A member of the Golden Tigers that worked for Chaka Khan.
 Teng - A member of the Golden Tigers that worked for Chaka Khan.
 Tommy - 
 Cockroach Hamilton – Criminal enforcer and a skilled marksman.
 Piranha Jones – Criminal with sharpened steel spikes for teeth.
 Lionfang - A teacher and circus worker who wears a special helmet that enables him to gain the strength, agility and fierceness of any animal. Although he was thought to have been killed by Scourge of the Underworld, he turned up alive but in a wheelchair.
 Gideon Mace – Dishonorably discharged Army colonel whose right hand was replaced by a spiked mace.
 Maggia - An international crime syndicate.
 Mangler - A professional wrestler.
 Harold Meachum – Business partner of Iron Fist, who betrayed him.
 Ward Meachum – Blamed Iron Fist for the death of Harold Meachum and tried to have him killed.
 Mr. Fish – Supervillain with a fish-like appearance.
 Albert Rackham - Albert Rackham was a prison guard at Seagate Prison. He was a racist abusive man who took particular interest in Carl Lucas. He attempted to kill Lucas when he volunteered for Noah Burstein's experiment, unintentionally giving him powers. Rackham however did not know that Lucas survived. Even after Lucas escaped, changing his name to Luke Cage, Rackham continued to work at Seagate abusing Comanche and Shades. Rackham lost his job at Seagate and tried looking for new employment. He eventually ran into Daily Bugle reporter Phil Fox, who had discovered that Luke Cage is actually Carl Lucas. With this knowledge, the two decide to blackmail Cage to work for them. They attempted to kidnap Claire Temple, but instead got Mrs. Jenks, a client of Cage. This blunder resulted in Rackham killing Fox and making it seem as if Claire kidnapped her. In order to save Mrs. Jenks, Cage teams up with Shades and Comanche, who were looking to enact their revenge on Rackham. After finding Rackham, they end up in a battle with Stiletto. In the confusion, Rackham is hit and killed by an ambulance and Mrs. Jenks dies, but not before she clears Claire's name.
 Sabretooth – He clashed with them several times before becoming a major antagonist of the X-Men.
 Scimitar – A master of bladed weapons.
 Scythe - An assassin hired by Harold Meachum to kill Iron Fist. Scythe was a talented martial artist whose name came from his use of a kusari-gama as his primary weapon. The Japanese weapon consists of a sickle connected to a weight by a long chain. He managed to choke Iron Fist with the chain of his weapon, but the hero summoned his chi and shattered Scythe's weapon. Unable to conceive the power of the Iron Fist, Scythe collapsed giving up Meachum's name. He was never seen again afterwards.
 Señor Muerte / Señor Suerte – Criminal thieves and assassins.
 Shades – A sunglasses-wearing criminal who was once in the same gang as Luke Cage. Ward Meachum later provided Shades with sunglasses that shot lasers.
 Spear – A criminal and brother of Mangler who uses a unique speargun.
 Steel Serpent – Rival of Iron Fist.
 Stiletto – Brother of Discus, wields knives and shoots blades from wrist devices.
 Wildfire - Harold Paprika is a racist who wields a flamethrower.
 X the Marvel - A former professional wrestler who was enhanced by the Super-Soldier Serum.
 Zzzax - A supervillain made from pure electricity.

References

Iron Fist (comics)
Lists of Marvel Comics characters
Lists of supporting characters in comics
Luke Cage